The politics of Île-de-France, France takes place in a framework of a presidential representative democracy, whereby the President of Regional Council is the head of government, and of a pluriform multi-party system. Legislative power is vested in the regional council.

Executive 
The executive of the region is led by the President of the regional council.

List of presidents

Legislative branch 
The Regional Council of Île-de-France (Conseil régional d'Île-de-France) is composed of 209 councillors, elected by proportional representation in a two-round system. The winning list in the second round is automatically entitled to a quarter of the seats. The remainder of the seats are allocated through proportional representation with a 5% threshold.

The Council is elected for a six-year term.

Current composition

References

External links 

 Île-de-France region

Île-de-France